Antonia Rufina Maymón Giménez (18 July 1881 – 20 December 1959)  was a Spanish rationalist pedagogue, militant naturist, anarchist, and feminist who published books on various topics.

Biography
Antonia Rufina Maymón Giménez was born on July 18, 1881 in Madrid, Spain to a family from Aragon. She studied to be a teacher in the 'Escuela Normal Femenina' of Zaragoza, a city where she also married professor Lorenzo Lagoon, an anarchist. For her membership in the National Committee against the war in Morocco, she was  tried and convicted, along with Teresa Claramunt and Josefa Lopez. In those years, she published her first newspaper articles in various anarchist journals, as 'La Enseñanza Moderna' (Modern Education) and 'Cultura y Acción' (Culture and Action). The couple was exiled to Bordeaux in 1911, but she received amnesty two years later after the death of her husband. Upon her return, she spoke at rallies across the country and worked as a teacher in schools in Barcelona, Sant Feliu de Guíxols, Elda and Beniaján. Driving the naturist movement in Spain, she participated in and presided over congresses on these ideals in Bilbao and Málaga. After the proclamation of the Second Spanish Republic, she moved to Beniaján, where she settled permanently. There, she gave rallies for the Confederación Nacional del Trabajo (CNT), held a school in her own home and developed an intense social work program among the needy. In 1932, she published "Estudios Racionalistas", where she exhibited her educational thoughts regarding children's education regardless of social class. At the end of the Spanish Civil War, she was convicted and imprisoned until 1944. Two years later, she was arrested and imprisoned  again for almost a year. Her health impaired, she returned to her home Beniaján where she gave private lessons. She died in a local hospital on 20 December 1959.

Selected works

Non-fiction 
 Anarquismo y naturismo (1925)
 Hacia el ideal (1927)
 Amamos (1932), with others
 Humanidad libre. Esbozo racionalista

Novels 
 Madre (1925)
 La perla (1927)
 El hijo del camino (1931)

References

Citations

Bibliography

External links 
 Movimiento de Renovación Pedagógica 'Antonia Maymón' (in Spanish)
 Artículo sobre Antonia Maymón en 'Rojo y Negro' (CNT)  (in Spanish)

1881 births
1959 deaths
People from Madrid
20th-century Spanish writers
20th-century Spanish politicians
Confederación Nacional del Trabajo members
Spanish educators
Spanish women educators
Rationalists
Naturism in Spain
Spanish anarchists
Spanish feminists
Spanish women novelists
Social nudity advocates
20th-century Spanish women